

Tournament

External links
 Season on hockeyarchives.info
 1922–23 season on svenskhockey.com 

Champ
Swedish Ice Hockey Championship seasons